The Cave of Mayrières supérieure is an archaeological site near Bruniquel, Tarn-et-Garonne, France, which contained two prehistoric cave paintings of bison until they were erased during an attempt to remove modern graffiti by members of the Eclaireurs de France, a French scouting association. The act earned them the 1992 Ig Nobel Prize in Archaeology.

References

External links
 Paintings before removal

Landforms of Tarn-et-Garonne
Mayrieres superieure
Archaeological sites in France